Song of China also known as Filial Piety is a 1935 Chinese film directed by Fei Mu and Luo Mingyou for the Lianhua Film Company.

Unlike earlier Lianhua films that railed against traditional society, Song of China is representative of the New Life Movement of Chiang Kai-shek, which celebrates traditional Confucian values.

Song of China is one of the few Chinese films made in the 1930s to be screened in the United States. The film is available with English translation on YouTube.

Cast 
Zheng Junli
Chen Yen-yen
Lim Cho Cho
Zhang Yi
Lai Cheuk-Cheuk

Plot 
A young man (Zheng Junli) returns home to see his elderly father before the latter dies. The father tells his son to extend the love he feels for his family to the greater good. The young man tries to teach the same principles to his children, who instead run off to the city to enjoy the city.

The man, however, moves to the countryside to build an orphanage. When his children eventually return, he gives them the same advice his father had given him.

References

External links 
 Song of China (1935): full film with English subtitles, and links to related materials, on scholarly website chinesefilmclassics.org
 
 
 Song of China at the UCSD Chinese Cinema Web-based learning center

1935 films
Chinese black-and-white films
1930s Mandarin-language films
Films directed by Fei Mu
1935 drama films
Lianhua Film Company films
Chinese drama films